Evelyne Khatsembula is a Kenyan paralympic track and field athlete. She represented Kenya at the 2000 Summer Paralympics and clinched a bronze medal in the women's 100m event under T37 classification.

References 

Date of birth missing (living people)
Living people
Kenyan female sprinters
Athletes (track and field) at the 2000 Summer Paralympics
Medalists at the 2000 Summer Paralympics
Paralympic bronze medalists for Kenya
Paralympic athletes of Kenya
Year of birth missing (living people)
Paralympic medalists in athletics (track and field)